Brosimum alicastrum, commonly known as the breadnut or ramon, is a tree species in the  family Moraceae of flowering plants, whose other genera include figs and mulberries. The plant is known by a range of names in indigenous Mesoamerican and other languages, including:  ojoche, ojite, ojushte, ujushte, ujuxte, capomo, mojo, ox, iximche, masica in Honduras, uje in the state of Michoacan Mexico, mojote in Jalisco,  in Haitian Creole and chataigne in Trinidadian Creole. In the Caribbean coast of Colombia it is called guaímaro or guaymaro.

Two subspecies are commonly recognized:
 B. a. alicastrum
 B. a. bolivarense (Pittier) C.C.Berg

Description 

Brosimum alicastrum is a monoecious plant. Birds are responsible for the dispersion of the seeds. A tree can produce 150–180 kg of fruits per year. It stays productive for 120–150 years. 

Distribution and habitat 
This tree is found on the west coast of central Mexico and in southern Mexico (Yucatán, Campeche), Guatemala, El Salvador, the Caribbean, and the Amazon basin. Large stands occur in moist lowland tropical forests at  elevation (especially 125–800 m), in humid areas with annual rainfall of 600–2000 mm , and average temperatures of 24 °C (75 °F).

History and culture 
The breadnut fruit disperses on the ground at different times throughout its range. It has a large seed covered by a thin, citrus-flavored, orange-colored skin favored by a number of forest creatures. More importantly for humans, the large seed which is enveloped by the tasty skin is an edible "nut" that can be boiled or dried and ground into a meal for porridge or flatbread. The name "breadnut" probably arose because the seeds can be ground to produce bread. Breadnut is nutritious and has value as a food source, and may have formed a part of the diet of the pre-Columbian Maya of the lowlands region in Mesoamerica, although to what extent has been a matter of some debate among historians and archaeologists: no verified remains or illustrations of the fruit have been found at any Mayan archaeological sites.

It was planted by the Maya civilization 2000 years ago and it has been claimed in several publications by Dennis E. Puleston to have been a staple food in the Maya diet. Puleston demonstrated a strong correlation between ancient Maya settlement patterns and the distribution of relic stands of ramon trees.

Other research has downplayed the ramon's significance. In the modern era, it has been marginalized as a source of nutrition and has often been characterized as a famine food.

The tree lends its name to the Maya archaeological sites of Iximché and Topoxte, both in Guatemala and Tamuin (reflecting the Maya origin of the Huastec peoples). It is one of the 20 dominant species of the Maya forest. Of the dominant species, it is the only one that is wind-pollinated. It is also found in traditional Maya forest gardens.

Cultivation 

A high density of seeds during the seedling offsets a reduced viability of the young plants and therefore enables a good yield. Seed storage is a common issue in breadnut production. Long storage adversely affects the germination rate, for example after three weeks it decreases by 10%. Refrigeration is not a solution as it risks killing the seeds.

Nutritional and culinary value 
The breadnut is high in fiber, calcium, potassium, iron, zinc, protein and B vitamins. It has a low glycemic index (<50) and is very high in antioxidants. The fresh seeds can be cooked and eaten or can be set out to dry in the sun and eaten later. Stewed, the nut tastes like mashed potato; roasted, it tastes like chocolate or coffee.  It can be prepared in numerous other dishes. In Petén, Guatemala, the breadnut is cultivated for exportation and local consumption as powder, for hot beverages, and bread.

Other uses 

Breadnut leaves are commonly used as forage for livestock during the dry season in Central America. The fruits and seeds are also used to feed all kinds of animals.

Carbon farming applications 
Brosimum alicastrum can be used for carbon farming as a nut crop or fodder.
It is an oxalogene tree. It can therefore undertake a bacterial-fungal endosymbiosis which assists the oxalate-carbonate pathway (OCP) and especially the chemical reaction of biomineralization, and in this case biocalcification (to produce CaCO3 from CO2 and to store it in the soils). This tree would therefore act as a carbon sink, while providing resources for both humans and animals.
This was first shown by a biogeochemist Eric Verrechia, researcher at University of Lausanne in 2006.

Soil restoration  
Brosimum alicastrum can be used to restore damaged soils. It can prevent erosion and act as a wind barrier. The tree tolerates poor, damaged, dried or salty soils and it requires a few inputs after its plantation. Furthermore, its oxalogenic activity increases the pH and the amount of organic matter in the soil once well implemented in the agricultural system. This leads to an increased fertility thanks to a buffer effect. Some research projects are currently on-going to develop this crop in its current distribution area.

See also 
 Artocarpus camansi, another plant also commonly known as "breadnut"

References

External links 

 Maya Nut Institute
 Crop of the Week: Maya Nut (Brosimum alicastrum, Moraceae)

Agriculture in Mesoamerica
alicastrum
Edible nuts and seeds
Perennial protein crops
Natural history of Mesoamerica
Trees of Guatemala
Trees of Mexico
Trees of Peru
Taxa named by Olof Swartz